Nijat Suleymanov (born on 15 November 1998) is an Azerbaijani footballer who last played as a midfielder for Qarabağ FK in the Azerbaijan Premier League.

Club career
On 12 May 2018, Suleymanov made his debut in the Azerbaijan Premier League for Qarabağ match against Keşla.

Honours
Qarabağ
 Azerbaijan Premier League (2): 2017–18, 2018–19

References

External links
 

1998 births
Living people
Association football midfielders
Azerbaijani footballers
Azerbaijan under-21 international footballers
Azerbaijan youth international footballers
Qarabağ FK players
Zira FK players
Azerbaijan Premier League players